Andrés Castro Ríos (October 4, 1942, Santurce, San Juan, Puerto Rico – September 16, 2006, Santurce, Puerto Rico) was a poet and graduate from the Humanities Faculty of the University of Puerto Rico. Castro Ríos is known as one of the founders of the "Guajana" magazine and as one of the composer of the lyrics for "¡Coño, Despierta Boricua!" (along with Miguel Ángel Hidalgo Vega—better known by his pen name "Guarionex Hidalgo Africano"—and Francisco Matos Paoli), a famous patriotic Puerto Rican song related to the Grito de Lares. Castro Ríos died from a heart attack in 2006.

See also
List of Puerto Ricans

References 

1942 births
2006 deaths
People from Santurce, Puerto Rico
Puerto Rican poets
Puerto Rican male writers
Puerto Rican composers
Puerto Rican male composers
20th-century American poets
20th-century American male writers
20th-century American male musicians